Austrophasma gansbaaiense is a species of insect in the family Mantophasmatidae. It is endemic to western South Africa, where it is only known from near Gansbaai in Western Cape Province.

References

Mantophasmatidae
Insects of South Africa
Endemic fauna of South Africa